The 11th Hour with Stephanie Ruhle is an American nightly news and politics television program airing weeknights at 11:00 pm ET on MSNBC that premiered on September 6, 2016. It was hosted by Brian Williams, the former host of NBC Nightly News. until December 9, 2021. The show began utilizing a rotating list of guest hosts on December 13, 2021. Stephanie Ruhle was named the subsequent full time host on March 2, 2022.

History 

The show launched on September 6, 2016, as a temporary program wrapping up the election news of the day, while previewing stories that will be top-ticket news items the next morning. It replaced a rerun of All In with Chris Hayes.

The program is Williams' second show in MSNBC's primetime schedule, as he formerly hosted The News with Brian Williams, which aired on the network from 1996 to 2002 before moving to CNBC. Originally the program was Monday to Thursday only, and despite its name, aired for only a half hour. The last half hour of Hardball aired following the half hour program. At times the program was extended due to breaking news coverage. The program expanded to Friday nights in January and on March 20, 2017, was extended to one hour daily. On April 13, 2017, MSNBC officially extended the program to an hour long.

The program primarily features interviews with reporters covering the major stories of the evening, panels composed of former government officials and subject matter experts, and the occasional politician. Williams eschews the conflict-ridden panels of competing opinion shows. Interviews with newsmakers are either live or to tape as close to air time as possible, to maintain immediacy. Similar to the original Nightline which focused on the Iran hostage crisis, the program focused primarily on the actions of the presidency of Donald Trump and Williams leads each broadcast noting the number of days since the Trump presidency began, as well as how many days remain before it ends. Since the presidency of Joe Biden began, the program now counts the number of days of the Biden administration and mostly discusses Biden administration actions.

After the 2016 election, the program continued to air despite its initial billing as a temporary program. In February 2019, the New York Post labeled the show as a "legit hit," noting it had been "beating CNN and Fox News for three months straight."

NBC News contributors Nicolle Wallace and Eugene Robinson provided commentary on most of the 2016 editions. Wallace also served as a substitute anchor in Williams' absence. Wallace's duties on the program resulted in her hosting her own show, Deadline: White House.

Williams announced on the November 9, 2021, episode of The 11th Hour with Brian Williams that he would be leaving NBC News and MSNBC at the expiration of his contract the following month, after five years hosting the show and 28 years with the networks. Williams' final broadcast was December 9, on which he announced that the show would continue to air and have rotating guest hosts such as Ali Velshi and Chris Jansing from December 13, 2021 to February 25, 2022.

On January 27, 2022, it was reported that Stephanie Ruhle, who had been part of the rotation while hosting MSNBC Reports will become The 11th Hours new permanent host. The first episode with Ruhle as permanent host aired on March 2.

On May 27, 2022, following the Robb Elementary School shooting, the show aired a special titled Enough Is Enough that discusses gun culture in the United States.

References

External links 

2016 American television series debuts
2010s American television news shows
2020s American television news shows
English-language television shows
MSNBC original programming
Flagship evening news shows